Land's End is the fifth album by American singer-songwriter Jimmy Webb, released in 1974 by Asylum Records.

Track listing
All songs were written by Jimmy Webb.

 "Ocean in His Eyes" – 4:27
 "Feet in the Sunshine" – 3:28
 "Cloudman" – 3:45
 "Lady Fits Her Blue Jeans" – 4:05
 "Just This One Time" – 4:58
 "Crying in My Sleep" – 4:10
 "It's a Sin" – 3:06
 "Alyce Blue Gown" – 4:58
 "Land's End/ Asleep on the Wind" – 9:07

Personnel
 Jimmy Webb – vocals, keyboards  
 Jim Ryan – guitar  
 Paul Keogh – guitar  
 Fred Tackett – guitar  
 Dean Parks – guitar  
 B.J. Cole – steel guitar 
 Davey Johnstone – mandolin 
 Phillip Goodhand-Tait – keyboards  
 David Hentschel – synthesizer  
 Tom Scott – saxophone  
 Brian Hodges – bass  
 Dee Murray – bass  
 Barry DeSouza – drums  
 Nigel Olsson – drums  
 Ringo Starr – drums  
 Susan Webb – vocals  
 Joni Mitchell – vocals  
 Bob Fisher – mastering  
 Richie Unterberger – liner notes

References

Jimmy Webb albums
1974 albums
Albums produced by Jimmy Webb
Asylum Records albums